The Wisconsin Herd are an American professional basketball team in the NBA G League based in Oshkosh, Wisconsin, and are affiliated with the Milwaukee Bucks. The Herd play their home games at Oshkosh Arena.

History
On June 29, 2016, it was announced that the Milwaukee Bucks were seeking to purchase an expansion team in the then-NBA Development League, listing their five finalist cities as Grand Chute, La Crosse, Oshkosh, Racine and Sheboygan.  On August 3, it was announced that Grand Chute and La Crosse had been eliminated, with Oshkosh, Racine and Sheboygan as the three finalists. On December 19, Oshkosh city officials identified the former site of the Buckstaff Furniture Company as the site for their arena proposal for the team, with the Fox Valley Pro Basketball group submitting a bid to the city's planning commission on January 11.  The Planning Commission approved it on January 19, with the Oshkosh Common Council approving it on January 24, conditional on the Bucks choosing Oshkosh as their home.

On February 7, 2017, the Milwaukee Business Journal reported that the Bucks had chosen Oshkosh's bid, with the team making the official announcement on February 8. On June 8, the Wisconsin Herd name was announced, with the logo unveiled on June 22. On July 1, 2017, Dave Dean was named the team's general manager and the coaching staff was announced on September 22.

The team was in first place in the league during the 2019–20 season and had clinched a playoff spot when the season was curtailed by the onset of the COVID-19 pandemic in March 2020. The Herd was then one of 11 teams that opted out of participating in the single-site 2020–21 season where all league games were played at ESPN Wide World of Sports Complex near Walt Disney World Resort in Bay Lake, Florida. All Bucks' two-way players could be assigned to the Lakeland Magic. The Herd returned for the 2021–22 season with former assistant coach Chaisson Allen as the team's new head coach and Tony Bollier as general manager.

Season-by-season

Current roster

Head coaches

NBA affiliates
 Milwaukee Bucks (2017–present)

References

External links

 

 
2017 establishments in Wisconsin
Basketball teams established in 2017
Basketball teams in Wisconsin
Milwaukee Bucks
Sports in Oshkosh, Wisconsin